Pa Deh may refer to:
 Pa Deh, Kohgiluyeh and Boyer-Ahmad
 Pa Deh, Semnan